Stafiyata is a rural locality (a village) in Polozovoskoye Rural Settlement, Bolshesosnovsky District, Perm Krai, Russia. The population was 3 as of 2010. There is 1 street.

Geography 
Stafiyata is located on the Siva River, 54 km south of Bolshaya Sosnova (the district's administrative centre) by road. Lisya is the nearest rural locality.

References 

Rural localities in Bolshesosnovsky District